A fish trap is a trap used for fishing.

Fish trap or Fishtrap may also refer to:

Fishtrap, Alabama, an unincorporated community in Talladega County
Fishtrap, Kentucky, an unincorporated community located in Pike County
Fishtrap, Washington, a ghost town
Fishtrap Lake State Park, in Pike County, Kentucky
Fishtrap Lake, in the above park
Fishtrap Cove, in Antarctica